Rzędowice may refer to the following places:
Rzędowice, Miechów County in Lesser Poland Voivodeship (south Poland)
Rzędowice, Proszowice County in Lesser Poland Voivodeship (south Poland)
Rzędowice, Opole Voivodeship (south-west Poland)